Patrick Abada (born 20 March 1954 in Paris) is a retired French pole vaulter and Olympian, having competed in the 1976 Summer Olympics. His best vault was one of 5.70 m, made on 26 August 1983, in Brussels. As of August 2001, that mark was the 126th best pole vault of all time. He represented France in pole vaulting 25 times between 1973 and 1985.

International competitions

1Representing Europe

Physical characteristics
Height: 
Weight:

Current work 
He is currently president of the athletics section of the Racing Club de France
.

Personal life
Abada is from an Algerian family of Turkish origin.

Notes

External links 
 https://www.lequipe.fr/Athletisme/AthletismeFicheAthlete1137.html
 
 
 

1954 births
Living people
Athletes from Paris
French male pole vaulters
Athletes (track and field) at the 1976 Summer Olympics
Olympic athletes of France
World Athletics Championships athletes for France
Universiade bronze medalists in athletics (track and field)
French sportspeople of Algerian descent
French people of Turkish descent
Mediterranean Games gold medalists for France
Mediterranean Games medalists in athletics
Athletes (track and field) at the 1983 Mediterranean Games
Universiade bronze medalists for France
Medalists at the 1979 Summer Universiade
20th-century French people